Alfred Holt may refer to the following people:
Alfred Holt (1829–1911), British engineer, ship owner and merchant
Alfred Holt (American football) (1866–1901), American football coach and academic
Alfred Holt (cricketer) (1863–1942), English first-class cricketer
Alfred Holt Colquitt (1824–1894), American lawyer, preacher, soldier, and politician
Alfred Holt Stone (1870–1955), American writer, politician, and tax commissioner